Aicher is a surname. Notable people with the surname include:

Anton Aicher (1859–1930), Austrian artistic theatre director
Gretl Aicher, (1928–2012), Austrian artistic theatre director
Otl Aicher, (1922–1991), German graphic designer and typographer

See also
Eicher (disambiguation)
Aich (disambiguation)

German-language surnames